Pygaerinae is a subfamily of the moth family Notodontidae, the silver prominents and relatives. The genus list is preliminary, as not all Notodontidae have been assigned to subfamilies yet.

Genera 
 Caschara
 Clostera
 Coscodaca
 Ginshachia
 Ginshachia bronacha
 Ginshachia gemmifera
 Gonoclostera
 Gluphisia
 Metaschalis
 Micromelalopha
 Pterotes
 Pygaera
 Rhegmatophila
 Rosama
 Spatalia
 Spatalia argentina

Notodontidae